Srinwanti Chakrabarti is an Indian classical dancer and choreographer specializing in the style of Odissi. She was initiated into the dance form at five and flowered as a professional dancer while in her teens. She worked in England for several years as a dance educator, choreographer and performer. She has also founded an arts centre called "Srijati" in Kolkata where she has trained several dancers and formed her own dance troupe. Her innovative choreography has received positive reviews both in India and abroad. She has performed extensively in France, introducing many dancers to her practiced form of Odissi in Paris. She has also performed and held workshops in Switzerland, Belgium, Italy, Sweden, Romania, US and Canada.

Early life and education 
Srinwanti was born in Bardhaman in West Bengal and later moved to Kolkata with her family. She studied at St. Xavier's school in Bardhaman and at Auxilium Convent in Kolkata. She received her Bachelor of Arts degree in sociology from Presidency College, Kolkata and then her Master of Arts degree in the same from the University of Calcutta.

Even in her childhood Srinwanti had a penchant for dancing; she started dance training under her mother and was inducted into the Odissi dance form when only five.

She was first guided and groomed by Smt. Sutapa Talukdar and Smt. Nandini Ghosal. Her talents flourished under the tutelage of Kelucharan Mohapatra who helped her immensely in learning the intricacies of the dance form. Her father was a major inspiration behind her choosing a career in Indian classical dance which is not very usual in India in families with no other professional performing artist.

Srinwanti was also interested to pursue her doctoral studies for which she started researching on dance movement therapy and the application of traditional dance in bringing social wellness. Earlier she wrote a paper titled Hindu temple Women (Devdasi) - The Divine Prostitution as part of her master's thesis. Due to her commitment in her professional career as a dancer she could not pursue her doctoral studies further.

Career in dance 
Srinwanti identified her life with the rhythm of Odissi and she dedicated herself to the arduous practice of the classical genre from young. As a prodigy Srinwanti acquired a high level of expertise in the dance form even when a teenager.

By the age of 15, Srinwanti was a professional dancer. She included her own innovative choreography in her performances. In 2000, she started her own dance institute called Srijati in Kolkata, and her own dance troupe, mainly of her students. Both as a solo artist and along with her dance troupe, Srinwanti gave a series of dance shows and launched her productions throughout India.

From 2006, Srinwanti worked intensively in England with the company Kala The Arts. She also conducted series of educational workshops and lecture demonstrations in schools, did choreographic productions which were commissioned by Anvil Arts and launched in various theatres and art centres.

In 2010 she moved to Paris where she started her own dance association, Srijati. She has trained several dancers both at Kolkata and Paris.

Srinwanti has performed and given workshops in USA, Canada, England, France, Italy, Switzerland, Belgium, Romania and Sweden. She has performed both classical Odissi and her own experimental choreographic works.

References

Srinwanti, Kala the Arts and dance projects in UK schools
Srinwanti's demonstration to students at Centre Mandapa Paris
Srinwanti's lecture demonstration on Odissi at University of Chicago
Srinwanti's workshop on Odissi at University of Chicago
Srinwanti's performance at Bordeaux, France
Srinwanti noted as an "inspirational teacher"
Srinwanti listed as a famous Odissi dancer
Srinwanti in an innovative and contemporary approach to Odissi
Srinwanti's artist profile
Srinwanti's profile in Odissi dance
Srinwanti's artist profile in Bengali
Srinwanti in Vence, France
Another artist's profile of Srinwanti

External links
Personal website of Srinwanti Chakrabarti

Odissi exponents
Living people
1983 births
People from Bardhaman
University of Calcutta alumni
Dancers from West Bengal
Indian female classical dancers
Performers of Indian classical dance
Women artists from West Bengal